Lambton was a lighthouse tender that operated for the Canadian government on the Great Lakes in the early 20th century.

Lambton was constructed in 1909 in Sorel, Quebec, and served for the Department of Marine and Fisheries.

On April 18, 1922, she departed Sault Ste. Marie, Ontario with keepers for the lighthouses at Ile Parisienne, Caribou Island, and Michipicoten Harbour. She traveled through Whitefish Bay in the company of two other vessels, Glennfinnan and Glenlivet, and sometime during the day Lambton and Glennfinnan collided. Lambton also broke her steering gear, and was forced to proceed with improvised repairs. Following the storm, it was reported that the lighthouses Lambton had been scheduled to visit were not lit, and a tugboat was dispatched to follow her route to attempt to determine her fate. After almost a week of searching passed with no sign of the ship, Lambton was declared lost.

References

Great Lakes ships
Missing ships
Ships lost with all hands
Shipwrecks of Lake Superior
1909 ships
Maritime incidents in 1922
Lighthouse tenders of Canada
Ships built in Quebec